George Martin Reynolds is a United States Air Force brigadier general who most recently served as the Vice Commander of the United States Air Force Warfare Center.

References

External links

Year of birth missing (living people)
Living people
Place of birth missing (living people)
United States Air Force generals